King Jaja of Opobo (full name: Jubo Jubogha; 1821–1891) was the first king (amanyanabo) of Opobo. He was also the founder of Opobo city-state in present day Rivers State of Nigeria. Born in Umuduruoha Amaigbo in present-day Imo State, his actual birth date, as well as his birth parents, is unknown. At an indeterminate date, Jaja was kidnapped and sold into slavery. He was then brought to Ijawland thereafter.

As was customary amongst the Ijaw, Jaja earned his way out of slavery after serving his master for a number of years. At the death of his master, he took charge of the trade and went on to head the Anna Pepple House merchant faction of Bonny. Under him, Anna Pepple absorbed other trade houses until a war with the Manilla Pepple House led by Oko Jumbo compelled Jaja to break away to form the Opobo city-state (26 miles east of Bonny) in 1869.

Opobo came to be a prominent trading post in the region's palm oil trade. Jaja barred entry to European and African middlemen, effectively monopolizing trade, and by 1870 was selling eight thousand tons of palm oil directly to the British. Opobo also shipped palm oil directly to Liverpool. Despite his trade rivalry with the Europeans, Jaja sent his children to schools in Glasgow and enlisted whites to staff the secular school he built in Opobo. He barred any missionaries from entering Opobo.

At the 1884 Berlin Conference the Europeans designated Opobo as British territory. When Jaja refused to cease taxing the British traders, Henry Hamilton Johnston, a British vice consul, invited Jaja for negotiations in 1887. Jaja was arrested on arrival aboard a British vessel; he was tried in Accra in the Gold Coast (now Ghana) then exiled, first to London, and later to Saint Vincent and Barbados in the British West Indies. His presence in the West Indies was alleged to be the cause of civil unrest, as the people of Barbados, of African descent, were upset at the poor treatment of a King from their homeland.

In 1891, Jaja was granted permission to return to Opobo, but died en route. Following his exile and death, the power of the Opobo state rapidly declined. In 1903 the King Jaja of Opobo Memorial was erected in his honor in Opobo town centre.

See also 
 Legends of Africa

References

Notes

Sources

External links
King Jaja of Opobo at Black History Pages
History of Opubo-Ama (Opobo Town) at Igbani-Awo Association

, a Barbadian folk song referencing the king

1821 births
1891 deaths
People from Opobo
19th-century Nigerian businesspeople
Opobo monarchs
People from colonial Nigeria
19th-century monarchs in Africa